Catherine Muraga (born circa 1977), is a Kenyan information technology professional and corporate executive, who works as the managing director at Microsoft's Africa Development Center (ADC), based in Nairobi, Kenya's capital city. She took up that office on 1 June 2022. Before that, she was the head of engineering at Stanbic Bank Kenya and Stanbic Bank South Sudan.

Background and education
Muraga is Kenyan by birth. After attending local primary and secondary schools, she was admitted to Africa Nazarene University, a private university in Kenya. She graduated from there with a Bachelor of Science in Computer Science degree. Later, she attended the Fintech Program at the Saïd Business School of the University of Oxford, in the United Kingdom. She also attended the Digital Strategies for Business course at Columbia University, in the United States.

Career
As of June 2022, Muraga's career in information technology went back more than 15 years. She has varied experience in several business sectors including aviation, banking and manufacturing. Previous employers include East African Breweries Limited, Kenya Airways and Sidian Bank, where she worked as the Director of IT and Operations, for four and one half years.

At Microsoft's ADC in Nairobi, Muraga replaced Jack Ngare, who served as managing director at the ADC from 2019 when it was established until his resignation in April 2022. In her current position, she leads a team of over 450 computer scientists and engineers.

See also
 Rowena Turinawe

References

External links
 Catherine Muraga: Chief Information Officer Stanbic Bank Kenya As of April 2020.

1970s births
Living people
21st-century Kenyan businesswomen
21st-century Kenyan businesspeople
Kenyan business executives
Kenyan women business executives
Kenyan chief executives
Microsoft people
Kikuyu people
Africa Nazarene University alumni
Columbia University alumni
Alumni of the University of Oxford